Josef Urbach (9 March 1889 – 8 October 1973) was a German painter. His work was part of the painting event in the art competition at the 1936 Summer Olympics.

References

1889 births
1973 deaths
20th-century German painters
20th-century German male artists
German male painters
Olympic competitors in art competitions
People from Neuss